This is a list of all equipment ever used by the Canadian armed forces. This will include all branches of the Canadian armed forces the Canadian Army, Royal Canadian Air Force, Royal Canadian Navy and any predecessors.

Canadian Army 

 List of military weapons of Canada

Royal Canadian Air Force 

 List of aircraft of Canada's air forces

Royal Canadian Navy 

 List of ships of the Royal Canadian Navy

References

Canadian military-related lists
Canada